Taxus floridana, the Florida yew, is a species of yew, endemic to a small area of under 10 km² on the eastern side of the Apalachicola River in mesophytic forests of northern Florida at altitudes of 15–40 m. It is listed as critically endangered. It is protected in reserves at the Torreya State Park and at the Nature Conservancy's Apalachicola Bluffs and Ravines Preserve, and has legal protection under the United States and Florida Endangered Species laws.

Description
It is an evergreen coniferous shrub or small tree growing to 6 m (rarely 10 m) tall, with a trunk up to 38 cm diameter. The bark is thin, scaly purple-brown, and the branches are irregularly orientated. The shoots are green at first, becoming brown after three or four years. The leaves are thin, flat, slightly falcate (sickle-shaped), 1–2.9 cm long and 1–2 mm broad, with a bluntly acute apex; they are arranged spirally on the shoots but twisted at the base to appear in two horizontal ranks on all except for erect lead shoots. Individuals typically occur in clumps and are multi-stemmed with varying stem densities . It is dioecious, with the male and female cones on separate plants; the seed cone is highly modified, berry-like, with a single scale developing into a soft, juicy red aril 1 cm diameter, containing a single dark brown seed 5–6 mm long and occur singly on few leaf axils. The pollen cones are globose, 4 mm diameter, produced on the undersides of the shoots in early spring.

It occurs in the same region as the even rarer Torreya taxifolia and is similar to it in general appearance, but can be told by the shorter, blunt-tipped (not spine-tipped) leaves and the less strong smell of the crushed leaves. Distinction from other yew species is more difficult, and like most yews it has sometimes been treated as a subspecies of Taxus baccata, as T. baccata subsp. floridana (Nutt. ex Chapm.) Pilger.

Ecology 
Taxus floridana grows slowly, and prefers slightly acidic soil and partial shade on moderate north-facing slopes and is highly fire sensitive as well as shade tolerant. Potential influences on their distribution include variation of soil, aspect, and moisture. There is no indicator species associated with it. It is hardy to USDA zone 8. It can be grown from cuttings or seeds. Seed scarification is required for germination and it persists through layering and sprouting. Birds feed on their cones and excavate stems for insects.

Uses
The bark contains paclitaxel, a mitotic inhibitor used to combat numerous forms of cancer. The seeds and leaves, however, are poisonous to humans if consumed.

Threats 
White-tailed deer rubbing and browsing particularly on small stems, being a source of food for beavers, and occurring in areas subject to logging and development are all potential threats to the few existing populations. Threats of habitat degradation and reduced regeneration capabilities are the most prominent issue, which have resulted in no new recruitment in the past few decades, greatly affecting population demographics. There are a couple of populations located on unprotected private lands, which are particularly susceptible.

References

floridana
Trees of the Southeastern United States
Critically endangered flora of the United States
Endemic flora of Florida
Taxa named by Alvan Wentworth Chapman
Taxa named by Thomas Nuttall